Schlachtgeschwader 10 (SG 10) was a Close air support wing in the Luftwaffe of Nazi Germany during World War II. The Geschwader was formed on 18 October 1943 in Berdychiv from the Stab of Schnellkampfgeschwader 10. SG 10 was formed in October 1943 with I. Gruppe (I./SG 10) formed from I./Schnellkampfgeschwader 2, II. Gruppe (II./SG 10) from IV./Schnellkampfgeschwader 10 and III. Gruppe (III./SG 10) from II./Sturzkampfgeschwader 77.

Commanding officers
Oberstleutnant Helmut Viedebantt, December 1943 – July 1944
Oberstleutnant Georg Jakob, 30 January 1945 – 8 May 1945

References

Luftwaffe Wings
Military units and formations established in 1943
Military units and formations disestablished in 1945